Krynka may refer to the following places in Poland:
Krynka, Lower Silesian Voivodeship (south-west Poland)
Krynka, Lublin Voivodeship (east Poland)

Also Krynka may refer to the river in Ukraine: Krynka (river)